Section 3 of the Constitution of Australia deals with the salary of Governor General. The salary of Governor-General is paid from the Consolidated Revenue Fund and is regulated by the Constitution, which fixed the initial salary at £10,000, an amount that would not increase until 1974.

The Constitution
Section 44 of the Constitution states :

History
The salary remained unchanged at £10,000 until the introduction of decimal currency in Australia in 1966 when it became A$20,000 and remained unchanged until 1974. The 1st Governor-General, Lord Hopetoun, received no allowance for maintaining Government Houses in Melbourne and Sydney nor for staff, travel or other expenses. Instead the Governor-General was required to meet these from the fixed salary. The 2nd Governor-General, Baron Tennyson fared slightly better, with an allowance for the operation of Government House in Melbourne and Sydney, and the Official Secretary to the Governor-General was paid by the Australian government. The Governor-General was required to meet staff salaries and some household expenses from their salary. The requirement to meet staff salaries continued until the retirement of the 12th Governor-General, Sir William McKell, with half his salary going on "staff sustenance". The contribution to household expenses continued until the retirement of the 17th Governor General, Sir Paul Hasluck. Before the appointment of Sir John Kerr as the 18th Governor-General in 1974, the salary was increased to $30,000, and the government covered all expenses. Today, the salary is set to be slightly higher than that of the Chief Justice of the High Court, over a five-year period. Until 2001, Governors-General did not pay income tax on their salary; this was changed after the Queen agreed to pay tax.

A question of currency

The ten thousand pounds specified by the Constitution referred to the currency in use in Australia in 1901, pound sterling. This was replaced by the Australian pound in 1910, which was linked to the gold standard at parity to £ sterling until 1931. When the United Kingdom abandoned the gold standard in 1931, the Australian pound was devalued and traded at a discount to pound sterling of around 25%. The Australian pound was replaced by the Australian dollar on 14 February 1966, where £1 Australian equalled A$2.

It has been argued unsuccessfully that that legislation passed in Australia since 1966 is unconstitutional because it has been signed by Governors-General who were paid in dollars, not pounds as specified by section 3 of the Constitution.

References

Australian constitutional law
Governors-General of Australia